Dry Creek station is an light rail station in Lone Tree, Colorado, United States. It is served by the E and R Lines, operated by the Regional Transportation District (RTD), and was opened on November 17, 2006. The station features a public art installation of a series of stainless steel tubes holding hourglasses that contain pyrite entitled Fools Gold. It was created by John McEnroe and dedicated in 2006.

References 

RTD light rail stations
Railway stations in the United States opened in 2006
2006 establishments in Colorado
Centennial, Colorado
Transportation buildings and structures in Arapahoe County, Colorado